Extraleague may refer to:

 Floorball
 Ekstraliga (men's floorball), the top league in Poland
 Football
 Ekstraliga (women's football), the top women's league in Poland
 Ice hockey
 Belarusian Extraleague, the top league in Belarus
 Czech Extraliga, the top league in Czech Republic
 Slovak Extraliga, the top league in Slovakia
 Rugby union
 KB Extraliga, the top league in Czech Republic
 Ekstraliga (rugby), the top league in Poland
 Speedway
 Ekstraliga (speedway), the top league in Poland